A school bus contractor is a private company or proprietorship that provides student transport services to a school district or non-public school. Of the 450,000 school buses operating in the United States, it is estimated that approximately 39% are operated by school bus contractors. In Canada (with some still operated by the school boards) and the United Kingdom, almost all school transportation is performed by contractors. 

A school bus contractor may range in size from an individual driver with a single bus, to a small company serving a single school or district, to a large multi-national company with as many as 60,000 buses. 

Major school bus contractors currently operating in the United States and Canada include First Student, National Express, and Student Transportation Inc.

See also 
 School bus (vehicle)
 Student transport (logistics)
 School bus yellow
 Frank W. Cyr, Father of the Yellow School Bus

References 

School buses
School bus operators
Student transport